The 1980 Professional Ticket Event was a snooker main tour qualifying event held by the World Professional Billiards and Snooker Association (WPBSA), which took place from 7 to 13 December 1980. The tournament was played at the Snooker Centre in Sheffield, Yorkshire, and featured eight invited amateur players who hoped to qualify to compete on the main tour as professionals for the following season. It was promoted by Mike Watterson on behalf of the WPBSA.

Dave Martin won the tournament, beating Eugene Hughes 9–6 in the final.  Hughes recorded the highest break of the event, 132, in the 13th frame of the final.

At the time of the tournament, the WPBSA had a policy that only winners of the World Amateur Snooker Championship, the English Amateur Championship or a Professional Ticket event would be admitted as professional players. This was changed so that "established amateur international snooker players and winners of prestigious amateur titles" would also be considered, and by February 1981, Watterson, Hughes and Paul Medati had all been accepted as professionals, along with Jack Fitzmaurice (who had withdrawn from the Professional Ticket Event because he felt it was an unfair system) and Dessie Sheehan. Billy Kelly and Mick Fisher had applied but were rejected.

Main draw
Results for the tournament are shown below.

Final

Century breaks
There were two century breaks at the tournament:
 132  Eugene Hughes
 100  Billy Kelly

Notes

References

Snooker non-ranking competitions
Snooker competitions in England
1980 in snooker
1980 in English sport